The Monkees is the debut studio album by the American band the Monkees. It was released in October 1966 by Colgems Records in the United States and RCA Victor in the rest of the world. It was the first of four consecutive U.S. number one albums for the group, taking the top spot on the Billboard 200 for 13 weeks, after which it was displaced by the band's second album. It also topped the UK charts in 1967. The Monkees has been certified quintuple platinum by the RIAA, with sales of over five million copies.

The song "Last Train to Clarksville" was released as a single shortly before the release of the album and went to the top of the Billboard Hot 100 chart. It was the only hit single from the album. "I'll Be True to You" was previously released as a single by the Hollies in January 1965 under the title "Yes I Will".

Background
In late 1965, a pilot for the TV series The Monkees was approved by Screen Gems, the television branch of Columbia Pictures. Producers Bob Rafelson and Bob Schneider (also known as Raybert Productions)'s idea on a sitcom about a garage band, inspired on Richard Lester's A Hard Day's Night and Rafelson's own experiences as a musician, was initially to gather funds to produce experimental movies. After advertising an open casting call on Variety magazine and doing several applications with 437 aspirants, actor/musician Micky Dolenz, British singer/stage actor Davy Jones, recording artist/songwriter Michael Nesmith and Greenwich Village folk musician Peter Tork impressed Raybert enough to be chosen as the Monkees in September 1965. Despite their different backgrounds and initial tensions, the Monkees got along during the filming rehearsals.

Before the pilot was filmed in November 1965, songwriters Tommy Boyce and Bobby Hart were brought to the project by their songs publisher, Screen Gems head of music division Don Kirshner, and commissioned by Raybert to score the episode. There were vague promises that Nesmith and Tork would record their own music. Boyce and Hart then composed and recorded four songs that were used on the original pilot. In February 1966, Columbia ordered 32 episodes of the show after the second screening of the pilot was a success. Soon after, Rafelson and Schneider called Kirshner to be the musical supervisor over the show, because he could supply music enough to the weekly episodes with his extensive portfolio of Brill Building songwriters in his publishing firm.

Dubbed "the Man with the Golden Ear", Kirshner viewed potential in merging television and music, and initially favored Mickie Most, Snuff Garrett, and Carole King for producing the Monkees, but sessions with them did not work well, so Boyce and Hart were called back.  Kirshner then negotiated a partnership between Screen Gems and RCA Victor to enter into a joint venture called Colgems Records primarily to distribute Monkees records.

Recording 
The album was recorded in numerous separate sessions around Los Angeles from July 5–25, 1966. Early sessions were produced by the trio of Tommy Boyce, Bobby Hart, and Jack Keller; later sessions were produced by Boyce and Hart. Michael Nesmith produced two sessions scheduled around the work done by Boyce, Hart, and Keller.

Famously, the Monkees were not permitted by their management to function as a working band for this album.  Although the album cover credits the band as playing instruments (drums for Dolenz; guitar for the other three members), the group's actual contributions were limited almost entirely to vocal tracks. Seven of the album's 12 tracks feature one lone Monkee singing lead vocal over instrumentation and backing vocals recorded entirely by a group of session musicians which varies from song to song. Other tracks feature multiple Monkees singing over session players; only on the two tracks produced by Michael Nesmith does a Monkee (Peter Tork) play an instrument (guitar). (Nesmith wrote or co-wrote these two tracks.) No tracks on the album feature all four Monkees.

Artwork

The photos in the "film strip" on the left side of the back cover are from two episodes of [[The Monkees (TV series)|The Monkees'''' TV series]]. The first three photos are from "Your Friendly Neighborhood Kidnappers"; the other two are from the episode "The Spy Who Came in from the Cool". Also included are brief stats on each band member (height, weight, age).

Early pressings of the LP cover, as well as side 1 of the label, featured the misspelled song "Papa Jean's Blues" (Catalog number COM/COS 101). This was soon corrected as "Papa Gene's Blues" (Catalog number COM/COS 101 RE). It was standard practice for RCA to add an "RE" when any one side of a record or sleeve had a revision. Open copies of both versions are easy to find. In addition, when the album was reissued in 1968 the Colgems' logo replaced the word "Colgems" on the bottom right-hand corner of the reverse side (Catalog number COS 101 RE2).

Track listing

Original 1966 Colgems vinyl issue
Side 1

Side 2

1994 Rhino CD reissueTracks 1–12: Original album in stereo''

"I Can't Get Her Off My Mind" (Prev. unissued early version) – 2:55
"I Don't Think You Know Me" (Prev. unissued alternate version) (Goffin, King) – 2:18
"(Theme from) The Monkees" (Prev. unissued early version) – 0:52

1996 Sundazed vinyl reissue
Bonus track at the end of Side 1: "I Can't Get Her Off My Mind" (Prev. unissued early version) – 2:55
Bonus track at the end of Side 2: "I Don't Think You Know Me" (Goffin, King) (Prev. unissued alternate version) – 2:18

2006 Rhino Deluxe CD reissue
The following tracks were included on the 2006 deluxe edition of the album. Some were previously unreleased, while others were on the 1994 Rhino reissue or the Missing Links series. Studio chatter is included between some bonus tracks.

Disc One

Tracks 1–12: Original album in stereo

"(Theme from) The Monkees" (First Recorded Version) – 1:03
"The Kind of Girl I Could Love" (Alternate Mix) (Nesmith, Roger Atkins) – 2:06
"I Don't Think You Know Me" (Micky's Vocal) (Goffin, King) – 2:16
"So Goes Love" (Second Recorded Version) (Goffin, King) – 3:31
"Papa Gene's Blues" (Alternate Mix) (Nesmith) – 1:59
"I Can't Get Her Off My Mind" (First Recorded Version) – 3:38
"(I Prithee) Do Not Ask for Love" (Alternate Mix) [Davy's vocal] (Michael Martin Murphey) – 3:11
"Gonna Buy Me a Dog" (Backing Track) – 2:59
"Monkees Radio Spot" (Previously Unissued) – 0:53

Disc Two

Tracks 1–12: Original album in mono

"Kellogg's Jingle" – 0:20
"All the King's Horses" (Nesmith) – 2:21
"You Just May Be the One" (TV Version) (Nesmith) – 1:59
"I Wanna Be Free" (TV Version) – 2:46
"I Don't Think You Know Me" (Mike's Vocal) – 2:16
"I Won't Be the Same Without Her" (Original Mono Mix) (Goffin, King) – 2:41
"Propinquity (I've Just Begun to Care)" (Demo Version) (Nesmith) – 2:27
"(Theme from) The Monkees" (TV Version) – 0:50

2014 Rhino Super Deluxe CD reissue
Disc 1
Tracks 1–12: Original album in mono
Tracks 13–24: Original album in stereo

Bonus Material
"(Theme from) The Monkees" (First Version)
"You Just May Be the One" (Mono TV Mix) †
"This Just Doesn't Seem to Be My Day" (Mono TV Mix) †
"Take a Giant Step" (Mono TV Mix) †
"All the King's Horses" (Mono TV Mix) †
"I Wanna Be Free" (TV Version – Mono TV Mix) †
"The Kind of Girl I Could Love" (Alternate Mono Mix) †
"Monkees NBC Promo Spot" †
"Saturday's Child" (Mono TV Mix) †
"Kellogg's Jingle"
"Monkees Radio Spot"
"(Theme from) The Monkees" (TV Version)

Disc 2: The Monkees - Sessions
"I Wanna Be Free" (Overdubbed Demo - Take 2) †
"All the King's Horses" (Alternate Vocal Take) †
"The Kind of Girl I Could Love" (Alternate Vocal Take) †
"I Don't Think You Know Me" (Stereo Remix - Micky's Vocal) †
"(Theme from) The Monkees" (Master Backing Track) †
"Let's Dance On" (Master Backing Track) †
"This Just Doesn't Seem to Be My Day" (Master Backing Track) †
"Gonna Buy Me a Dog" (Version One - Backing Track Take 5) †
"So Goes Love" (Take 1) †
"So Goes Love" (Version Two - Alternate Vocal Take) †
"Papa Gene's Blues" (Backing Track - Take 1) †
"Papa Gene's Blues" (Alternate Vocal Take) †
"I'll Be True to You" (Stereo Remix) †
"I Won't Be the Same Without Her" (Backing Track - Take 6) †
"I Won't Be the Same Without Her" (Stereo Remix) †
"Sweet Young Thing" (Backing Track - Take 1) †
"Sweet Young Thing" (Stereo Remix) †
"You Just May Be the One" (Rehearsal & Backing Track - Take 19) †
"You Just May Be the One" (Stereo Remix) †
"I Wanna Be Free" (Version Two - Backing Track Take 6) †
"I Wanna Be Free" (Version Three - Backing Track Take 3) †
"I Wanna Be Free" (Version Three - Stereo Remix) †
"Jokes" (Backing Track) †
"Tomorrow's Gonna Be Another Day" (Master Backing Track) †
"Gonna Buy Me a Dog" (Backing Track Take 2) †
"I Can't Get Her Off of My Mind" (Version One - Stereo Remix) †
"Mary, Mary" (Backing Track - Take 1) †
"Of You" (Backing Track - Take 1) †
"Of You" (Stereo Remix) †
"(I Prithee) Do Not Ask for Love" (Rehearsal) †
"(I Prithee) Do Not Ask for Love" (Stereo Remix of Davy's Vocal) †

Disc 3
David Jones - The Original Mono Album
"What Are We Going to Do?"
"Maybe It's Because I'm a Londoner"
"Put Me Amongst the Girls"
"Any Old Iron"
"Theme for a New Love"
"It Ain't Me Babe"
"Face Up to It"
"Dream Girl"
"Baby It's Me"
"My Dad"
"This Bouquet"

David Jones - The Singles
"Take Me to Paradise"
"The Girl from Chelsea"

David Jones - The Original Stereo Album
(Does not include "Dream Girl", as there is no true stereo mix known to exist)
"What Are We Going to Do?"
"Maybe It's Because I'm a Londoner" 
"Put Me Amongst the Girls 
"Any Old Iron" 
"Theme for a New Love" 
"It Ain't Me Babe" 
"Face Up to It"
"Baby It's Me" 
"My Dad" 
"This Bouquet"

Michael Blessing - The Singles
"The New Recruit"
"A Journey With Michael Blessing"
"Until It's Time for You to Go"
"What Seems to Be the Trouble, Officer?"
"Who Do You Love" †
"Get Out of My Life Woman" †

The Monkees - Demos
"I Wanna Be Free" (Rehearsal) †
"I Wanna Be Free" (Demo - Take 12) †
"I Wanna Be Free" (Demo remake - Take 1) †
"I Wanna Be Free" (Demo remake - Take 5) †

Note
† indicates a previously unissued recording

Session information

"(Theme from) The Monkees"
 Written by Tommy Boyce and Bobby Hart
 Lead vocal: Micky Dolenz
 Backing vocals: Tommy Boyce, Bobby Hart, Wayne Erwin, Ron Hicklin
 Guitar: Wayne Erwin, Gerry McGee, Louie Shelton
 Bass: Larry Taylor
 Drums: Billy Lewis
 Tambourine: Gene Estes
 Organ: Bobby Hart
 Finger snaps: Unknown
 Recorded at RCA Victor Studios, Hollywood, California; July 5 (2:00 p.m.–7:30 p.m.) and 9, 1966
 Produced by Tommy Boyce, Bobby Hart, Jack Keller

"Saturday's Child"
 Written by David Gates
 Lead vocal: Micky Dolenz
 Backing vocals: Tommy Boyce, Bobby Hart, Wayne Erwin, Ron Hicklin
 Guitar: Wayne Erwin, Gerry McGee, Louis Shelton
 Bass: Larry Taylor
 Drums: Billy Lewis
 Tambourine: Gene Estes
 Organ: Bobby Hart
 Recorded at RCA Victor Studios, Hollywood, California; July 9, 1966 (2:00 p.m.-9:00 p.m.)
 Produced by Tommy Boyce, Bobby Hart, Jack Keller

"I Wanna Be Free"
 Written by Tommy Boyce and Bobby Hart
 Lead vocal: Davy Jones
 Acoustic guitar: Wayne Erwin, Gerry McGee, Louie Shelton
 Harpsichord: Michel Rubini
 Violins: Bonnie Douglas, Paul Shure
 Viola: Myra Kestenbuam
 Cello: Fred Seykora
 Recorded at RCA Victor Studios, Hollywood, California; July 19, 1966 (2:00 p.m.–6:00 p.m.)
 Producers: Tommy Boyce, Bobby Hart

"Tomorrow's Gonna Be Another Day"
 Written by Tommy Boyce and Steve Venet
 Lead vocal: Micky Dolenz
 Acoustic guitar: Tommy Boyce
 Electric guitars: Wayne Erwin, Gerry McGee, Louie Shelton
 Bass: Larry Taylor
 Drums: Billy Lewis
 Harmonica: Gerry McGee
 Percussion: Unknown
 Recorded at RCA Victor Studio #1, Hollywood, California; July 23 (2:00 p.m.-8:00 p.m.) and 26, 1966
 Producers: Tommy Boyce, Bobby Hart

"Papa Gene's Blues"
 Written by Michael Nesmith
 Lead vocal: Michael Nesmith
 Harmony vocal: Micky Dolenz
 Guitars: Peter Tork, James Burton, Glen Campbell, Al Casey, Jim Helms
 Bass: William Pitman
 Drums: Hal Blaine 
 Percussion: Gary Coleman, Jim Gordon (vibraslap)
 Recorded at Western Recorders Studio 2, Hollywood, California; July 7 (8:00 p.m.–11:30 p.m.), 16 and 30, 1966
 Producer: Michael Nesmith
 First album pressing features title incorrectly listed as "Papa Jean's Blues"

"Take a Giant Step"
 Written by Gerry Goffin and Carole King
 Lead vocal: Micky Dolenz
 Backing vocals: Micky Dolenz, Ron Hicklin and unknown
 Electric guitars: Wayne Erwin, Gerry McGee, Louie Shelton
 Harpsichord: Michael Rubini
 Bass: Larry Taylor
 Drums: Billy Lewis
 Percussion: Gene Estes
 Oboe: Bob Cooper
 Recorded at RCA Victor Studio C, Hollywood, California; July 9, 1966 (2:00 p.m.-9:00 p.m.)
 Producers: Tommy Boyce, Bobby Hart
 Arranger: Leon Russell
 Alternate mix appears in The Monkees episode "The Chaperone," featuring single vocal track and different backing vocals

"Last Train to Clarksville"
 Written by Tommy Boyce and Bobby Hart
 Lead vocal: Micky Dolenz
 Backing vocals: Peter Tork and Davy Jones
 Acoustic guitar: Tommy Boyce
 Electric guitars: Wayne Erwin and Gerry McGee
 Bass: Larry Taylor
 Drums: Billy Lewis
 Percussion: Gene Estes
 Recorded at RCA Victor Studio A, Hollywood, California; July 25, 1966 (7:00 p.m.-3:00 a.m.)
 Producers: Tommy Boyce, Bobby Hart

"This Just Doesn't Seem to be My Day"
 Written by Tommy Boyce and Bobby Hart
 Lead vocal: Davy Jones
 Backing vocals: Davy Jones, Tommy Boyce, Bobby Hart, Wayne Erwin, Ron Hicklin
 Guitars: Wayne Erwin, Gerry McGee, Louie Shelton
 Bass: Larry Taylor
 Drums: Billy Lewis
 Percussion: Gene Estes
 Cello: Joseph Ditullio
 Recorded at RCA Victor Studios, Hollywood, California; July 5, 1966 (2:00 p.m.–7:30 p.m.)
 Producers: Tommy Boyce, Bobby Hart, Jack Keller
 Longer mix with an extended instrumental break featured in The Monkees episodes "Royal Flush" and "The Chaperone"

"Let's Dance On"
 Written by Tommy Boyce and Bobby Hart
 Lead vocal: Micky Dolenz
 Backing vocals: Micky Dolenz, Peter Tork, Tommy Boyce, Bobby Hart, Wayne Erwin, Ron Hicklin
 Guitars: Wayne Erwin, Gerry McGee, Louie Shelton
 Organ: Bobby Hart
 Drums: Billy Lewis
 Percussion: Gene Estes
 Recorded at RCA Victor Studios, Hollywood, California; July 5, 1966 (2:00 p.m.–7:30 p.m.)
 Producers: Tommy Boyce, Bobby Hart, Jack Keller

"I'll Be True to You"
 Written by Gerry Goffin and Russ Titelman
 Lead vocal: Davy Jones
 Backing vocals: Tommy Boyce, Bobby Hart, Ron Hicklin
 Guitars: Wayne Erwin, Gerry McGee, Louie Shelton
 Bass: Larry Taylor
 Drums: Billy Lewis
 Glockenspiel: Gene Estes
 Recorded at RCA Victor Studio C, Hollywood, California; July 9, 1966 (2:00 p.m.-9:00 p.m.)
 Producers: Tommy Boyce, Bobby Hart, Jack Keller
 Mono mix features double-tracked vocals
 Originally titled "Yes I Will".
 This is the only track from the original album not to be featured on the TV show.
 Different version appears on Rhino/Flashback CD Last Train from Clarksville and Other Hits

"Sweet Young Thing"
 Written by Michael Nesmith, Gerry Goffin, Carole King
 Lead vocal: Michael Nesmith
 Backing vocals: Micky Dolenz, Peter Tork and unknown
 Guitars: Peter Tork, James Burton, Glen Campbell, Al Casey, Michael Deasy
 Bass: Bob West
 Dano bass: Peter Tork, James Burton, Glen Campbell, Al Casey, Mike Deasey
 Drums: Hal Blaine, Frank DeVito, Jim Gordon
 Violin: Jimmy Bryant
 Percussion: Gary Coleman, Frank DeVito
 Piano: Larry Knechtel
 Recorded at RCA Victor Studios, Hollywood, California; July 18 (8:00 p.m.-12:00 a.m.) and 27, 1966
 Producer: Michael Nesmith

"Gonna Buy Me a Dog"
 Written by Tommy Boyce and Bobby Hart
 Lead vocals: Micky Dolenz, Davy Jones
 Guitar: Wayne Erwin, Gerry McGee, Louie Shelton
 Organ: Bobby Hart
 Bass: Larry Taylor
 Drums: Billy Lewis
 Recorded at RCA Victor Studio #1, Hollywood, California; July 23, 1966 (2:00 p.m.-8:00 p.m.)
 Producers: Tommy Boyce, Bobby Hart
 Davy can be heard saying "They're coming to take us away, ha ha..." at end; this refers to the July 1966 novelty hit by Napoleon XIV, "They're Coming to Take Me Away Ha-Haaa!"

1994 bonus tracks session information

"I Can't Get Her Off My Mind" (first recorded version)
 Written by Tommy Boyce and Bobby Hart
 Lead vocal: Davy Jones
 Backing vocals: Ron Hicklin and unknown
 Guitars: Wayne Erwin, Gerry McGee, Louie Shelton
 Tack piano: Bobby Hart
 Autoharp: Bobby Hart
 Bass: Larry Taylor
 Drums: Billy Lewis
 Marimba: Gene Estes
 Recorded at RCA Victor studios, Hollywood, California; July 25, 1966 (7:00 p.m.-3:00 a.m.)
 Producers: Tommy Boyce, Bobby Hart
 Re-recorded for Headquarters

"I Don't Think You Know Me" (Micky Dolenz vocal version)
 Written by Gerry Goffin and Carole King
 Lead vocal: Micky Dolenz
 Harmony/backing vocals: Michael Nesmith and unknown
 Guitars: James Burton, Glen Campbell, Al Casey
 Organ: Larry Knechtel
 Drums: Hal Blaine
 Percussion: Gary Coleman, Jim Gordon
 Bass: Bob West
 Recorded at RCA Victor Studios, Hollywood, California; June 25, 1966 (7:30 p.m.–12:15 a.m.)
 Producer: Michael Nesmith
 Arranger: Don Peake
 An alternate mix featuring Michael Nesmith on lead vocals and an alternate version featuring Peter Tork on lead vocals also exist.

"(Theme from) The Monkees" (first recorded version)
 Written by Tommy Boyce and Bobby Hart
 Lead vocal: Micky Dolenz
 Harmony vocals/producers: Tommy Boyce, Bobby Hart

2006 bonus tracks session information

"I Don't Think You Know Me" (Michael Nesmith vocal mix)
 Written by Gerry Goffin and Carole King
 Lead vocal: Michael Nesmith
 Harmony/backing vocals: Micky Dolenz and unknown
 Guitars: James Burton, Glen Campbell, Al Casey
 Organ: Larry Knechtel
 Drums: Hal Blaine
 Percussion: Gary Coleman, Jim Gordon
 Bass: Bob West
 Recorded at RCA Victor Studios, Hollywood, California; June 25, 1966 (7:30 p.m.–12:15 a.m.)
 Producer: Michael Nesmith
 Arranger: Don Peake
 An alternate mix featuring Micky Dolenz on lead vocals and an alternate version featuring Peter Tork on lead vocals also exist.

"So Goes Love" (second recorded version)
 Written by Gerry Goffin and Carole King
 Lead/backing vocals: Davy Jones
 Guitars: Peter Tork, James Burton, Glen Campbell, Al Casey, Jim Helms
 Bass: Bill Pittman
 Drums: Hal Blaine
 Electric Piano: Billy Preston
 Percussion: Gary Coleman, Jim Gordon
 Recorded July 7–25, 1966 
 Producer: Michael Nesmith
 Arranger: Don Peake
 Meant for use in the episode "The Monkees A La Mode", but replaced with "Laugh" at the last minute.

"(I Prithee) Do Not Ask for Love" (alternate mix)
 Written by Michael Martin Murphey
 Lead vocal by Davy Jones
 Harmony vocal by Micky Dolenz
 Guitar: Peter Tork, James Burton, Glen Campbell, Al Casey, Mike Deasy
 Bass: Bob West
 Drums: Hal Blaine
 Percussion: Gary Coleman, Jim Gordon
 Piano: Michael Cohen, Larry Knechtel
 Produced by Michael Nesmith
 Recorded on November 17, 1966

"All the King's Horses"
 Written by Michael Nesmith
 Lead vocal: Micky Dolenz
 Harmony vocals: Michael Nesmith
 Backing vocals: Micky Dolenz, Davy Jones, Michael Nesmith, Peter Tork
 Guitar: James Burton, Glen Campbell, Al Casey
 Bass: Larry Knechtel, Bob West
 Drums: Hal Blaine
 Percussion: Gary Coleman, Jim Gordon
 Recorded at RCA Victor Studios, Hollywood, California;June 25, 1966 (7:30 p.m.–12:15 a.m.)
 Producer: Michael Nesmith

"You Just May Be the One" (first recorded version)
 Written by Michael Nesmith
 Lead vocals: Michael Nesmith
 Harmony vocals: Micky Dolenz
 Backing vocals: Michael Nesmith and unknown
 Guitars/dano basses: Peter Tork, James Burton, Glen Campbell, Al Casey, Mike Deasy
 Bass: Bob West
 Drums: Hal Blaine
 Percussion: Garry Coleman, Frank DeVito
 Piano: Larry Knechtel
 Recorded at RCA Victor Studios, Hollywood, California; July 18, 1966 (8:00 p.m.-12:00 a.m.)
 Producer: Michael Nesmith
 The song features the doubling of regular bass with Danelectro or "dano" bass; the dano bass' distinctive twang gave Nesmith's 1966 tracks a country flavor. The doubling of bass proved difficult to master as some 35 takes were needed before the backing track was completed.
 The song was featured on three first-season episodes of The Monkees: "The Chaperone," "One Man Shy," and "Monkees a La Mode."

"I Wanna Be Free" (TV version)
 Written by Tommy Boyce and Bobby Hart
 Lead vocals: Davy Jones, Micky Dolenz
 Guitars: Wayne Erwin, Gerry McGee, Louie Shelton
 Bass: Larry Taylor
 Drums: Billy Lewis
 Tambourine: Gene Estes
 Organ: Michel Rubini
 Recorded at RCA Victor Studios, Hollywood, California; July 19, 1966 (2:00 p.m.–7:30 p.m.)
 Producers: Tommy Boyce, Bobby Hart

"I Won't Be the Same Without Her" (mono mix)
 Written by Gerry Goffin and Carole King
 Lead/backing vocals: Michael Nesmith
 Harmony vocals: Micky Dolenz and unknown
 Guitars/dano basses: Peter Tork, James Burton, Glen Campbell, Al Casey, Mike Deasy
 Bass: Bob West
 Drums: Hal Blaine
 Percussion: Gary Coleman, Frank DeVito
 Piano: Larry Knechtel
 Recorded at RCA Victor Studios, Hollywood, California; July 18, 1966 (8:00 p.m.-12:00 a.m.)
 Producer: Michael Nesmith

Charts

Album

Single

Certifications

Notes

References

Sources

External links 
 The Monkees (1966)

The Monkees albums
1966 debut albums
Arista Records albums
RCA Records albums
RCA Victor albums
Rhino Records albums
Sundazed Records albums
Colgems Records albums